Kerchipally  is a small village located in Valigonda mandal, Nalgonda district, in the Indian state of Telangana.

References

Villages in Nalgonda district

te:కేర్చిపల్లి